Jørn or Jorn is a given name. Notable people with the name include:

Given name:
Jørn Andersen (born 1963), Norwegian former professional footballer
Jorn Barger (born 1953), American blogger, editor of Robot Wisdom, an influential early weblog
Jørn Christensen (born 1959), Norwegian artist, actor, and record producer
Jørn Didriksen (born 1953), former speed skater from Norway
Jørn Goldstein (born 1953), Norwegian Olympic ice hockey goalie
Jørn Hurum (born 1967), Norwegian paleontologist and popularizer of science
Jørn Inge Tunsberg (born 1970), Norwegian black metal musician
Jørn Jamtfall (born 1966), Norwegian football coach and a former goalkeeper
Jørn Jensen, one of the earliest Danish programmers
Jørn Jeppesen (1919–1964), Danish stage and film actor
Jørn Krab (born 1945), Danish rower who competed in the 1968 Summer Olympics
Jørn Lande (born 1968), Norwegian heavy metal and hard rock singer, aka Jorn
Jørn Lier Horst (born 1970), Norwegian author of crime fiction and a police officer
Jorn Madslien (born 1967), journalist for BBC News Online
Jørn Magdahl (born 1950), Norwegian politician
Jørn Nielsen (born 1960), Danish mobster and high-ranking Hells Angels member
Jørn Rattsø (born 1952), Norwegian professor of economics at the Norwegian University of Science and Technology
Jørn Ronnie Tagge (born 1969), Norwegian convicted fraudster
Jørn Sørensen (born 1936), Danish former football player and Olympic silver medalist
Jørn Skaarup, retired male badminton player from Denmark
Jørn Skille (1942–2008), Norwegian civil servant
Jørn Sloth (born 1944), Danish chess grandmaster of correspondence chess
Jorn Smits (born 1992), Dutch handball player
Jørn Utzon, AC (1918–2008), Danish architect most notable for designing the Sydney Opera House in Australia
Jorn Vermeulen (born 1987), Belgian football player who plays in the defense

Middle name
Michael Jørn Berg (born 1955), former Danish handball player
Jens Jørn Bertelsen (born 1952), retired Danish footballer
Halle Jørn Hanssen (born 1937), Norwegian TV correspondent, development aid administrator, politician

Surname:
Asger Jorn (1914–1973), artist, essayist, founding member of the Situationist International

See also
JORN, the Jindalee Operational Radar Network in Australia
Jörn, the locality in Sweden
Jorn (band), metal music band

Danish masculine given names
Norwegian masculine given names